Triveni is a municipality in Bajura district in the Sudurpashchim Province of Nepal. It was formed in March 2017 as decided by the Cabinet in line with the Constitution of Nepal 2015, recommended by the Local Bodies Restructuring Commission (LBRC).

It is formed by merging previous 3 VDCs named Kailashmandau, Chhatara and Tolidewal. It is divided into nine wards. It has Kalikot District in the East, Budhiganga Municipality in the West, Badimalika Municipality in the North and Accham District in the South.

The population of this municipality is 18,363 of which 8,631 are male and 9,732 are female. The total number of households is 3,350.

Etymology
The name of this municipal is derived from the tributaries of three river which is locally termed as "Triveni". It is a religious place which is situated at an altitude of over 3,000-meter from the sea level.

History
Previous 3 VDCs named Kailashmandau, Tolidewal and Chhatara have been merged and formed Triveni Municipality which has Martadi as district headquarter. Triveni is one of the 4 municipalities of Bajura District located at mid mountain region of Sudurpashchim Province.

Geography
Triveni municipality is located to the southern part of Bajura district. It is separated by Budhi Ganga River following from higher himalayan region which later joins the Malagada river which is the point from where the Triveni Municipality starts. It is divided into 9 wards numbered from 1 to 9. It has Kalikot District in the East, Budhiganga Municipality in the West, Badimalika Municipality in the North and Accham District in the South.

Climate
Warm days followed by cool morning & nights. Summer are cool and winter are mild to cold. Snow fall is expected during the winter rain.

Economy
Agriculture is the main occupation of the people of this region followed by small scale livestock. The agricultural production is not enough to earn a living throughout the year, the youth and elderly people go to India and remittance is the major source of income of people.

Culture
Majority of the people follow Hinduism. Dashain and Tihar are the major festivals. Chaitalo and Aanantya are the locally celebrated festivals in the form of deuda by men and women where they express their love, joy and sorrows in the form of song. Bhuwo is another traditional dance played by the elderly and young boys using Talwar putting on old traditional clothes forming a circle. It is played for 3 to 5 days. This dance also shows how to fight with the enemy in the battlefield.

Tourism

Tourism can be the major source of revenue, as this municipality is rich for culture and major pilgrimage center of Sudurpashchim Province, 
Badimalika Temple where thousands of pilgrimage visit this temple during Janai Purnima from all over Nepal and India in the belief that their wishes will be fulfilled is also located here. Nateshwori Temple is another temple located in ward no.7 of this municipality. It is a Hindu temple mainly worshiped for Devi Bhagawati, Dhalpura Devi and Kalika Devi. There is huge crowd of people especially on the day of Janai Purnima, pilgrim who visited Badimalika return home paying visit to this temple as this temple is considered to be the elder sister of Malika Devi (Badimalika Temple). While locals people pay visit on regular basis and mainly during Chaite Dashain.

Electricity and water supply
Now almost all the villages of this municipality have electricity facilities and all the villages also have clean drinking water. Now they don't have to travel to fetch water.

Demographics
At the time of the 2011 Nepal census, the population of Triveni Municipality was 18,363, out of which 8,631 were male and 9,732 female. The average household size was 5.48. The ratio of male to female (sex ratio) was 88.69.

99.2% spoke Nepali, 0.5% Sherpa, 0.1% Tamang and 0.1% other languages as their first language.

In terms of ethnicity/caste, 63.1% were Chhetri, 11.2% Kami, 6.2% Sarki, 3.9% Hill Brahmin, 3.9% Badi, 2.8% Sanyasi/Dasnami, 2.7% other Dalit, 2.6% Damai/Dholi, 2.4% Thakuri, 1.1% Limbu and 0.1% others.

In terms of religion, 100.0% were Hindu.

Education
There are now enough Primary and Higher Secondary Schools but no Bachelor's Level and above programs. Student come to Kathmandu and other major cities to pursue their further studies. Drop out ratio is higher although people have started to send their children to school at early age. 
The literacy rate is 57.79.

Higher Secondary Schools
Ratna Higher Secondary School, Seliphal
Masteshwori Higher Secondary School, Pandhara
Tolidewaldanda Secondary School, Toli
Tribhuwaneshwori Secondary School, Chhatara

Secondary schools
Parwati Secondary School, Paima
Kailaseswori Secondary School
Badimalika Secondary School
Rameshwori Secondary School
Parwati Secondary School, Chhatara

Lower Secondary Schools
Nateshwori Lower Secondary School
Narsingh Lower Secondary School
Nawadurga Lower Secondary School 
Khinni Satya Devi Lower Secondary School
Bhageswori Lower Secondary School
Dhalpuri Lower Secondary School
Khapar Devthali Secondary School
Navjyoti Secondary School

Primary schools
Nitteshwori Primary School
Balkalyan Primary School
Bhawani Primary School
Gayatri Primary School
Gyan Jyoti Primary School
Janata Primary School
Maha Laxmi Primary School
Nuwakot Primary School
Puspa Kamal Primary School
Sarswoti Primary School
Janajyoti Primary School
Triveni Primary School
Janta Primary School
Tripurasundari Primary School
Bajura Model Academy

Sports
Due to geographical location and less opportunities sports is not well developed here. Volleyball is the major sport played in all school and villages here.

Transport
There is now road access to almost all the villages of this municipality. This has been made possible by RAP 3 (Rural Access Program funded by UKAid through the UK's Department for International Development (DFID). The Maure- Kailashmandu and Maure- Toli- Chhatara road section almost 30 K.M has been handed over to the Local government.
Local government is further extending the road to inner villages with its own budget with the help of local people.

Healthcare
There is no good access to hospitals and people still seek Dhami and Jhakri in first phase. Though the number of Medicals has increased in every villages but they are not run by well qualified professionals. CMA (Community Medicine Assistant) owns the majority of the medical shops who can just provide basic health care. Severe case patients have to travel to Bayalpata Hospital of Achham District or to other cities for treatment. The small health center in Municipality are without qualified doctors and are run by Auxiliary Nurse Midwives (ANMs), Community Health Workers (CHWs) and Health Assistant (HA).

Bank and co-operatives
Earlier people had to travel long distance to district headquarter Martadi to make deposit, withdrawal or other banking transactions. Now with the establishment of IME(Online money transfer service) at Bamka and branch of Nepal Bank Limited at Tolidewal where the municipality office is located, it has become convenient for people of this municipality for making banking transactions.

Internet and communication
Communication used to be a major problem until few year back but with the extension of Tower of Telecommunication Service providers such as Nepal Telecom, Ncell and SKY communication has become easier. 
Currently Ncell and Nepal Telecom provide 2G network service but other Internet service providers (ISPs) are limited to Local Administration. Radio is the main source of news & entertainment but Television is limited to few homes.

References

Bajura District
Municipalities of Nepal
Nepal municipalities established in 2017
Municipalities in Bajura District